James L. Curtis (1870 – October 24, 1917) was the American Minister Resident/Consul General to Liberia (1915–1917).  During his tenure, Curtis was able to obtain Liberia's support for the Allied cause in World War I.

Curtis died in Free Town, Sierra Leone where he had gone to have an operation related to an undisclosed illness.  Prior to his tenure as ambassador, he was a lawyer most closely associated with Tammany Hall.

References

External links
Liberia and the First World War 1914–1926

1870 births
1917 deaths
American consuls
Lawyers from New York City
Ambassadors of the United States to Liberia
20th-century American diplomats
19th-century American lawyers